AmnesiA is a 2001 Dutch drama film directed by Martin Koolhoven.

Cast 
 Fedja van Huêt - Alex / Aram
 Carice van Houten - Sandra
 Theo Maassen - Wouter
  - Young Alex / Aram
  - Mother of Alex and Aram
  - Eugene
 Eva Van Der Gucht - Esther
  - The Doctor
  - Woman in flashback

References

External links 

2001 drama films
2001 films
Films directed by Martin Koolhoven
Dutch drama films